Kieschnick is a surname.  Kieschnick is Sorbian (or Wendish) for "cottager."  Notable people with this name include:

Brooks Kieschnick (born 1972), American retired baseball player
Gerald B. Kieschnick (born 1943), the 12th president of the Lutheran Church–Missouri Synod (LCMS)
Roger Kieschnick (born 1987), American baseball outfielder